Shive is an unincorporated community located in Central Hamilton County in Central Texas along Fm-221.

History

A group of people, including Lewis Paullin, settled in Shive in the 1870s. A man named Robert Shive was the namesake of the community. A post office opened inside a store operated by Robert and James W. Shive in 1884; Robert Shive was appointed as the postmaster. By 1908 the community of Shive had four stores. Around that period a cotton gin operated. In 1910 Shive had 50 residents. The post office closed in 1936. In 1940 Shive had 64 residents. In the period from 1980 to 2000, Shive had 61 residents.

Education
Shive is located in the Hamilton Independent School District.

Shive received its first school, called the Union Hill School, in 1883.

References

External links

Unincorporated communities in Hamilton County, Texas
Unincorporated communities in Texas